Adafienu is a coastal community located in the Volta Region of Ghana near Denu. Citizens of Adefienu are noted for fishing in the Atlantic Ocean, in May 2007 the fishermen caught a large fish measuring 4.2 metres long, 1.2 metres wide a meter high.

Notable people 
 Seth Anthony

References 

Populated places in the Volta Region